Lophocampa petulans is a moth of the family Erebidae. It was described by Paul Dognin in 1923. It is found in Ecuador.

References

 

petulans
Moths described in 1923